Neotibicen lyricen, the lyric cicada, is a species of cicada in the family Cicadidae.

Subspecies
These three subspecies belong to the species Neotibicen lyricen:
 Neotibicen lyricen engelhardti (Davis & W.T., 1910) g b (dark lyric cicada)
 Neotibicen lyricen lyricen g b (lyric cicada)
 Neotibicen lyricen virescens (Davis, 1935) b (coastal lyric cicada)
Data sources: i = ITIS, c = Catalogue of Life, g = GBIF, b = Bugguide.net

References

Further reading

External links

 
 

Insects described in 1773
Cryptotympanini
Taxa named by Charles De Geer